Learning As You Go is the fourth album by Hispanic-American country music singer Rick Trevino. It features "Running Out Of Reasons To Run", which was Trevino's only number-one single on the Billboard Hot Country Singles & Tracks chart. The title track was a #2 hit on the same chart and also reached #1 on the R&R chart, while "I Only Get This Way with You" and "See Rock City" peaked at #7 and #44, respectively.

The album was also released in Spanish under the title Mi Vida Eres Tú ("My Life Is You" or "You Are My Life"), with Spanish-language versions of most of the songs on Learning as You Go.

Track listing (Learning as You Go)

Track listing (Mi Vida Eres Tú)
"Mi Vida Eres Tú (I Only Get This Way with You)" - 3:281
bilingual version of "I Only Get This Way with You"
"Estoy Tán Solo" - 3:291
"Se Escapan Mis Razones" - 3:051
"Oh Jenny" - 3:072
"Serio Amor" - 3:302
"Mi Vida Eres Tú" - 3:451
"Me Duele Que la Trate Tan Bien" - 3:131
"Vico Por Ti" - 3:201
"Donde Vas" - 2:412
"Serio Amor" - 4:302
Dance mix
"I Only Get This Way with You" - 3:36
English-language version

1Spanish translation by Manny Benito.
2Spanish translation by Frank Varona.

Personnel (Learning as You Go)
Eddie Bayers – drums
Steve Buckingham – acoustic guitar
Dan Dugmore – steel guitar
Larry Franklin – fiddle, mandolin
Paul Franklin – steel guitar
Steve Gibson – acoustic guitar, mandolin
John Hobbs – piano, keyboards
Dann Huff – electric guitar
David Hungate – bass guitar
Roy Huskey Jr. – upright bass
Liana Manis – background vocals
Brent Mason – electric guitar
Joey Miskulin – accordion
Farrell Morris – percussion
Steve Nathan – piano
Michael Rhodes – bass guitar
Brent Rowan – electric guitar
John Wesley Ryles – background vocals
Joe Spivey – fiddle, mandolin
Rick Trevino – lead vocals
Billy Joe Walker Jr. – acoustic guitar
Biff Watson – acoustic guitar
Dennis Wilson – background vocals
Lonnie Wilson – drums
Reggie Young – electric guitar

Chart performance

1997 albums
Columbia Records albums
Rick Trevino albums
Albums produced by Steve Buckingham (record producer)
Albums produced by Doug Johnson (record producer)